Kozioł is a Polish-language surname literally meaning he-goat. notable people with this surname include:

 Igor Kozioł (born 1967), Polish footballer
 Joe Koziol (born 1967), American soccer player
 Magdalena Kozioł (born 1981), Polish judoka
 Natalia Kozioł (born 2000), Polish rhythmic gymnast
 Stan Koziol, (1965–2014), American soccer player

See also
 
 Koziols Latvian-language form of the surname
 Kozel (surname)

 Polish-language surnames